Ranielli Jose Cechinato commonly known as Ranielli (born December 19, 1970) is a former Brazilian football player.

Born in Curitiba, Ranielli began playing football with Sociedade Esportiva e Recreativa Caxias do Sul. He played for Caxias until he joined Sociedade Esportiva Palmeiras in 1990.

Club statistics

References

External links

1970 births
Living people
Brazilian footballers
Brazilian expatriate footballers
Expatriate footballers in Japan
Sociedade Esportiva Palmeiras players
Santos FC players
Botafogo Futebol Clube (SP) players
Clube Atlético Juventus players
Esporte Clube Juventude players
Goiás Esporte Clube players
Santa Cruz Futebol Clube players
Ituano FC players
Sport Club do Recife players
Associação Atlética Ponte Preta players
J1 League players
Avispa Fukuoka players
Association football midfielders
Footballers from Curitiba